Events of 2023 in Zimbabwe.

Incumbents 

 President: Emmerson Mnangagwa
 Vice President
 Constantino Chiwenga

Events 
Ongoing: COVID-19 pandemic in Zimbabwe

Scheduled events 

2023 Zimbabwean general election

See also 

COVID-19 pandemic in Africa
African Continental Free Trade Area

References 

 
2020s in Zimbabwe
Years of the 21st century in Zimbabwe
Zimbabwe